Gilbert Primrose may refer to:

 Gilbert Primrose (minister) (c. 1580–1641), Scottish Calvinist minister
 Gilbert Primrose (surgeon) (c. 1535–1616), Scottish surgeon
 Gilbert E. Primrose (1848–1935), Scottish amateur footballer